Curtis Wood is a   Local Nature Reserve in Herne in Kent. It is owned and managed by Canterbury City Council.

This wood has diverse ground flora including early purple and greater butterfly orchids. There is also a semi-improved meadow.

There is access from Canterbury Road.

References

Local Nature Reserves in Kent